Megaradio was a German-speaking privately owned radio station, which transmitted on several frequencies from transmission facilities in Germany (and also from Marnach in Luxembourg). Its content was German-speaking pop music programs. Megaradio started broadcasting in 1997 and hired several Medium Wave transmitters in Germany.

Megaradio, which was also receivable in the whole of Europe at night-time, had no commercial success and so Megaradio was shut down on April 4, 2003 at 1 AM. Since then all transmitters used by Megaradio (except the Marnach transmitter up until the end of 2015) have been unused.

Defunct radio stations in Germany
Radio stations established in 1997
Radio stations disestablished in 2003